Dejan Kravić (born September 9, 1990) is a Serbian-Canadian professional basketball player for Victoria Libertas Pesaro of the Italian Lega Basket Serie A (LBA).

College career
Kravic started his college career with York University. In his sophomore season, Kravic averaged 15.6 points and 9.6 rebounds. In the 2011–12 season, he was redshirted. In the 2012–13 season, he played his first games for the Texas Tech Red Raiders. He was named to the First Team Academic All-Big 12.

Professional career

2014–15 season 
On July 21, 2014, he signed his first professional contract with Rethymno Aegean in Greece.

2015–16 season 
On August 25, 2015, his arrival to SPM Shoeters Den Bosch of the Netherlands was announced. Kravić averaged 14.4 points and 9.4 rebounds per game in the DBL regular season. In the playoffs, he averaged 12.4 points and 6.5 rebounds in 8 games.

2016–17 season 
On July 25, 2016, Kravić returned to Rethymno, signing a two-year deal.

2017–18 season 
On July 14, 2017, Kravić signed with Excelsior Brussels. On October 20, 2017, he left Brussels. In November 2017, he signed with Panionios of the Greek League.

The Basketball Tournament (TBT) 
In the summer of 2017, Kravić played in The Basketball Tournament on ESPN for Team Fredette. He competed for the $2 million prize, and for Team Fredette, he scored 12 points in their first round game, which they lost to Team Utah (Utah Alumni) 100-97.

2018–19 season 
On July 5, 2018, Kravić signed a deal with Virtus Bologna. With Virtus, he won the Basketball Champions League (BCL) trophy on May 5, 2019. The team beat Iberostar Tenerife in the final, Kravić had 4 points and 5 rebounds in the deciding game. Kravić joined Obradoiro in 2019 and averaged 13.2 points and 6.4 rebounds per game in ACB play.

2019–20 season 
On July 21, 2020, he has signed with San Pablo Burgos of the Liga ACB. He won the Basketball Champions League for a second year in a row with Burgos. He became the second player ever to have won two BCL titles, after Kevin Punter.

2021–22 season 
Kravić began the season with San Pablo Burgos and averaged 8.7 points, 5.9 rebounds, and 1.1 assists per game.

On January 28, 2022, he signed with Unicaja.

2022–23 season 
On August 16, 2022, he has signed with Victoria Libertas Pesaro of the Italian Lega Basket Serie A (LBA).

International career
Kravic is eligible to play in the Serbian national basketball team.

In June 2014, national team head coach Saša Đorđević included him on the preliminary list of 29 players being considered for the twelve roster spots for the 2014 FIBA World Cup. Three weeks later, in early July 2014, Kravić further made Đorđević's shortened list of 20 players invited for the training camp. However, in early August, following the training camp, he got cut as the team began its pre-tournament friendlies.

Career statistics

Europe

|-
| align=center | 2014–15
| rowspan="2" align="left"| Rethymno Aegean 
| rowspan="3" align="center"| GBL
| 26 || 16.6 || .510 || .000 || .500 || 4.8 || 0.2 || 0.4 || 0.8 || 6.6
|-
| align=center | 2016–17
| 13 || 22.2 || .638 || .000 || .571 || 5.7 || 0.4 || 0.9 || 1.0 || 9.4
|-
| align=center | 2017–18
| align=left | Panionios 
| 22 || 18.9 || .614 || .000 || .620 || 4.9 || 0.5 || 0.9 || 1.1 || 11.8
|-
| align=center | 2018–19
| align=left | Virtus Bologna 
| align=center | LBA
| 28 || 21.6 || .579 || .000 || .675 || 5.9 || 0.5 || 0.6 || 1.2 || 10.9
|-
| align=center | 2019–20
| align=left | Obradoiro 
| rowspan="2" align="center"| ACB
| 23 || 27.7 || .602 || .000 || .632 || 6.4 || 1.0 || 1.0 || 1.3 || 13.2
|-
| align=center | 2020–21
| align=left | San Pablo Burgos 
| 33 || 20.7 || .598 || .000 || .530 || 4.7 || 0.7 || 1.0 || 0.7 || 10.8
|-
|-class=sortbottom
| align="center" colspan=3 | Career
| 145 || 21.1 || .588 || .000 || .599 || 5.3 || 0.6 || 0.8 || 1.0 || 10.5

College

|-
| style="text-align:left;"| 2012–13
| style="text-align:left;"| Texas Tech
| 31 || 28 || 21.5 || .515 || .000 || .611 || 5.2 || 1.2 || .7 || 1.3 || 9.0
|-
| style="text-align:left;"| 2013–14
| style="text-align:left;"| Texas Tech
| 32 || 29 || 21.2 || .505 || .000 || .646 || 4.6 || .8 || .4 || 1.3 || 7.3
|- class="sortbottom"
| style="text-align:center;" colspan="2"| Career
| 63 || 57 || 21.3 || .511 || .000 || .628 || 4.9 || 1.0 || .6 || 1.3 || 8.1

Honours

Club
Den Bosch
NBB Cup: 2015–16
Dutch Supercup: 2015
Virtus Bologna
Basketball Champions League: 2018–19
San Pablo Burgos
Basketball Champions League: 2019–20, 2020–21
FIBA Intercontinental Cup: 2021

Individual
Dutch League All-Star: 2016
 York University male rookie of the year: 2010

References

External links
FIBA Europe Profile
Eurobasket.com Profile
Greek Basket League Profile 
Greek Basket League Profile 

1990 births
Living people
Baloncesto Málaga players
Brussels Basketball players
Canadian expatriate basketball people in Greece
Canadian expatriate basketball people in Italy
Canadian expatriate basketball people in the Netherlands
Canadian expatriate basketball people in Spain
Canadian expatriate basketball people in the United States
Canadian men's basketball players
Canadian people of Bosnia and Herzegovina descent
Canadian people of Serbian descent
CB Miraflores players
Centers (basketball)
Heroes Den Bosch players
Dutch Basketball League players
Lega Basket Serie A players
Liga ACB players
Obradoiro CAB players
Panionios B.C. players
Rethymno B.C. players
Serbian expatriate basketball people in Belgium
Serbian expatriate basketball people in Canada
Serbian expatriate basketball people in Greece
Serbian expatriate basketball people in Italy
Serbian expatriate basketball people in the Netherlands
Serbian expatriate basketball people in Spain
Serbian expatriate basketball people in the United States
Serbian men's basketball players
Serbs of Bosnia and Herzegovina
Texas Tech Red Raiders basketball players
Victoria Libertas Pallacanestro players
Virtus Bologna players
York University alumni
Yugoslav Wars refugees